The blackstripe cardinalfish, Ostorhinchus nigrofasciatus, is a cardinalfish from the Indo-Pacific. A yellow-black striped fish, it occasionally makes its way into the aquarium trade. It grows to 10 cm in length.

References

External links
 

nigrofasciatus
Fish described in 1953